This is a list of Slovak regions by GDP and GDP per capita.

List of Regions by GDP 
Regions by GDP in 2016 according to data by the OECD.

List of Regions by GDP per capita 
Regions by GDP per capita in 2016 according to data by the OECD.

References 

Prefectures by GDP per capita
Gross state product
Slovakia